Palnati Yuddham is a 1947 Indian Telugu-language historical war film jointly directed by L. V. Prasad and Gudavalli Ramabrahmam. Based on the Battle of Palnadu, the film stars Akkineni Nageswara Rao, Govindarajula Subba Rao and Kannamba, with music composed by Galipenchala Narasimha Rao. It is produced by Koganti Venkata Subba Rao under the Sri Sarada Productions banner.

The film was remade once again in Telugu with the same title in 1966, starring N. T. Rama Rao and Bhanumathi Ramakrishna.

Plot

Cast

Akkineni Nageswara Rao as Balachandrudu
Govindarajula Subba Rao as Brahmanaidu
Kannamba as Nayakuralu Nagamma
S. Varalakshmi as Maguva Manchala 
Teegala Venkateswarlu as Nalagama Raju
Mudigonda Lingamurthy as Narasinga  Raju 
D. S. Sadasiva Rao as Malideva Raju 
V. Koteswara Rao as Kannamadasu 
Gidugu Venkata Seetapati Rao as Kommaraju 
Koneru Kutumba Rao as Alaraju 
Vangara as Subbanna 		
A. Annapoorna as Renukamba
G. Visweswaramma as Iytamba
J. Gangaratnam as Anmamba
B. Narimani as Koyapilla
T. Rajabala as Dancer

Crew
Art: Nagoor, S. R. Valu
Choreography: Vempati
Dialogues - Lyrics: Samudrala Sr. 
Playback: Ghantasala, Sundaramma, Prayaga, Akkineni, Kannamba, S. Varalakshmi
Music: Gali Penchala Narasimha Rao
Story: Vempati Sadasivabrahmam
Editing: Maanikyam
Cinematography: Jiten Bannerjee 
Producer: Koganti Venkata Subba Rao 
Screenplay - Director: Gudavalli Ramabrahmam, L. V. Prasad
Banner: Sri Sarada Productions
Release Date: 24 September 1947

Soundtrack

Music was composed by Galipenchala Narasimha Rao. Lyrics were written by Samudrala Sr.

Production 
The shooting of the movie started in 1945 when after 10% of the shoot was completed, director Gudavalli Ramabrahmam expired with illness. Then L. V. Prasad took up the megaphone and completed it with Katuri Jaganmohan as his associate. At the beginning of the movie, Gudavalli's death and funeral scenes were shown.
Gudavalli Ramabrahmam and lyricist Samudrala were colleagues at the magazine Prajamithra, they had worked together the first time in this film. 
The movie was the first historical movie in Telugu and it is the debut film for S. Varalakshmi as a singer.

References

External links

1947 films
Films set in the 12th century
Indian war films
Films set in Andhra Pradesh
History of India on film
Indian films based on actual events
Films directed by L. V. Prasad
1940s Telugu-language films
1947 war films
Indian black-and-white films
Films scored by Gali Penchala Narasimha Rao